{{Infobox animanga/Header
| name            = Super Dimensional Fortress Macross II: Lovers Again
| image           = MacrossII Box Cover.jpg
| caption         = The VHS cover for Macross II original North American release.
| ja_kanji        = 超時空要塞マクロスII -LOVERS AGAIN-
| genre           = 
| creator         = 
}}

 is a six episode OVA in the Macross franchise. It was the first installment of Macross to feature a new cast of characters. Macross II was produced by Big West, with no involvement from the original series creators from Studio Nue or the original series animators from Tatsunoko Production.

Background
After Flash Back 2012, Studio Nue no longer wanted to work on Macross as a series. Big West continued alone, building from Do You Remember Love? with Macross II and three video games: Macross 2036 and Macross: Eien no Love Song for the PC Engine CD and Macross: Scrambled Valkyrie for the Super Famicom.

In light of this, Studio Nue decided to continue the story themselves, though they used the original television series as a base instead. This began with the 1994 Macross Plus and no further work is based on what is now considered a "Parallel World" timeline."Macross: A Future Chronicle", Macross Plus vol.1, 1994, Bandai Visual, BELL-704

Plot
The story takes place in 2092, 80 years after the events depicted in Macross: Do You Remember Love?  The SDF-1 Macross still exists, as does the U.N. Spacy Minmay Attack stratagem, which has been successfully employed to thwart the Zentradi threat ever since. However, a new humanoid alien race called the Marduk (Mardook in the original Japanese version), arrives in the Solar System with enslaved Zentradi and Meltlandi warriors who are seemingly unaffected by the Minmay Attack. The Marduk employ their own female singers, called Emulators, who incite their giant warriors with songs.

The story focuses on reporter Hibiki Kanzaki, who is caught in the middle of the action when he rescues an Emulator, Ishtar, while covering a battle between the U.N. Spacy and the Marduk. Hibiki proceeds to teach her about Earth's culture, which she then shares with the rest of the Marduk. However, the Marduk leader, Emperor Ingues, considers Earth's culture anathema. With the help of ace fighter pilot Silvie Gena, Hibiki and Ishtar attempt to end the war.

Characters

The series' main protagonist, Hibiki is an entertainment reporter for the television network Scramble News Network (SNN). Desiring to advance his career, he jumps at the chance to cover the first encounters with the Marduk. While covering one of the battles, he discovers Ishtar, an Emulator used to excite the Marduk forces' aggressive tendencies through her singing. Originally seeing the scoop of a lifetime, Hibiki harbors Ishtar on Earth and shows her Earth's culture but is eventually moved by Ishtar's belief in bringing peace to her people by spreading Earth's love songs. Hibiki also finds himself having to deal with the U.N. Spacy, which is overzealous in not allowing any possibility of public panics despite having the frontline pushed all the way back to Earth itself.

An Emulator within the Marduk race. Her singing enhances the aggressive tendencies of the Marduk's Zentraedi and Meltrandi warriors and allows the Marduk to control them. When Hibiki brings her to Earth, she is shocked by human culture and traditions. Because of her experiences, she changes her Emulator song to be one which encourages the Marduk to be peaceful. She believes the SDF-1 Macross is the legendary ship of the Alus, an entity prophesied in Marduk culture to bring peace to their civilization.

Sylvie is an ace Valkyrie II variable fighter pilot and commander of the Faerie Squadron. She has a Meltrandi grandmother, from whom she inherited her prowess at fighting (reportedly second only to Nexx Gilbert), and becomes very angry at the Marduk when she discovers that the aliens brainwash their Zentradi and Meltrandi soldiers. Hibiki's pursuit of a scoop of her secret meeting with Supreme Commander Exxegran makes her punch the reporter in the nose. Her feelings for him change over the rest of the series.

One of the UN Spacy's elite pilots, Nexx appears to be a bit narcissistic because of fighter pilots being highly popular in Earth society. Although he doesn't seem to go very far with Sylvie beyond a few dates, he is genuinely in love with her. He pilots a combat-worthy prototype of the VA-1SS Metal Siren variable fighter during the U.N. Spacy's fleet engagement against Marduk near the Moon and takes command of one of the two Macross Cannons committed to resist the final Marduk assault on Earth.

An idol singer who is used in the U.N. Spacy propaganda releases. She is known for singing  and  during the annual U.N. Spacy Moon Festival.

An SNN cameraman and war correspondent, Dennis believes in presenting both sides of a story even if it means getting it from deep behind enemy lines. He thinks Hibiki doesn't understand what journalism is really all about but nevertheless sees potential in him. He dies during Hibiki's first assignment with him inside a Marduk warship; his death has a significant impact on how Hibiki looks at the world of journalism.

A transsexual owner of a beauty salon, Mash is one of Hibiki's close friends. Their bond is good enough such that he is the one Hibiki turns to when the latter decides to harbor Ishtar after rescuing her on an assignment.

One of the U.N. Spacy's senior commanders, Exxegran has a noble spirit and is equally aware of how complacent the organization has become. He appears quite personable as Sylvie and her Faerie teammates look up to him as a father figure.

Feff is a commander in the Marduk forces. Despite his battlefield prowess, he does not entirely believe in Ingues's extreme enforcement of cultural purity and eventually turns on him once he understands what Ishtar is trying to do. Feff later confesses that he harbors feelings for Ishtar.

The Marduk Empire's supreme ruler, Ingues is cruel, despotic, and obsessed with eliminating any foreign culture. He even purges troops within the fleet that have been exposed to other cultures.

Commander of the U.N. Spacy's 12th Fleet, Balser leads from the fleet flagship Gloria during a valiant but ultimately futile defense against the Marduk invasion near the Moon. The Gloria is destroyed when the sheer number of Marduk warships overwhelms the defenders.

The Faerie Squadron
The Faerie Squadron is a trio of Valkyrie pilots under Silvie's command. In the final episode, all three of them later join Nexx Gilbert in manning a Macross Cannon ship.

She is interested in Nexx Gilbert and is always looking for a way to get closer to him.
Amy

ProductionMacross II began production in 1991 and debuted simultaneously in the United States and Japan, during the second quarter of 1992, in order to commemorate the 10th anniversary of the original The Super Dimension Fortress Macross television series.Napton, R.: "Superdimensional Fortress Macross II", Animerica, 1992, Vol.1, No.0, p.8  Out of the original Macross staff, only three of them returned for Macross II: Haruhiko Mikimoto (character designer), Sukehiro Tomita (scripter) and Yasunori Honda (sound director).  Shoji Kawamori, the creator of the original Macross series, did not participate in this project because, at the time, he had no interest in writing sequels. Since co-creator Studio Nue was also absent from this project, studios AIC and ONIRO handled the production.Macross II was framed as six episodes because, at the time, it was felt that short OVA series were the current trend in anime.  Initially conceived as taking place 300 years in the future, that number was pared down to 80 years during production.  Macross II also takes place in the same universe as the PC Engine Super CD-ROM² games Macross 2036 and Macross: Eternal Love Song.  The staff was not allowed to use any of the original Macross characters in this project.  Furthermore, the staff decided to avoid the "idol" singer concept that was propounded in the original series.  Their rationale was that Japan was experiencing an "idol boom" during the 1980s and Macross mirrored that.  Haruhiko Mikimoto explained that he and director Kenichi Yatagai differed on what they envisioned Macross II to be; compromises had to be made on both sides. The mechanical designs for Macross II were created by Junichi Akutsu, Jun Okuda and Koichi Ohata (who previously worked on Gunbuster).

MediaMacross II is a six-episode  OVA that was released in Japan from May 21, 1992, to November 21, 1992, on VHS volumes, on June 25, 2001, on DVD and on July 25, 2014, on Blu-ray. It was also broadcast on TV Tokyo from July 26, 1993, to August 30, 1993.

North American releases
U.S. Renditions released Macross II in 1992 and 1993, dubbed into English, on three VHS cassettes each containing two episodes. L.A. Hero released the series in 1993 as a movie in a limited number of theaters across the US as a 150-minute film on 35 mm film.

Manga Entertainment consolidated the six episodes in 1995 into a single VHS cassette called Macross II: The Movie. It was released as two VHS cassette variations: the first contained the English dub and the second contained the original Japanese dialogue with English subtitles.

In 2000, Macross II: The Movie was released on DVD by Manga Entertainment. This DVD included both the English dub and the original Japanese dialogue with English subtitles. Bonus materials included a music video (actually a creditless closing theme), four character profiles and an image and mechanical designs gallery.Macross II: The Movie was released as a downloadable video rental on the Xbox Live Marketplace for the Xbox 360 by Starz. This release only included the English dub and it was in standard definition. Manga Entertainment released Macross II in 2008 as a downloadable video purchase on the iTunes Store in its original six-episode format with each episode available individually. The episodes only include the English dub and they are in standard definition.

On May 2, 2011, a new version of the English dub movie was uploaded by Manga Entertainment to their YouTube channel.  This version only contains episodes 1 through 4.

Episode list

Soundtracks
The music score was composed by Shiro Sagisu, who subsequently became famous for his works on Neon Genesis Evangelion. J-pop singer Mika Kaneko composed and performed the series opening and ending theme songs while Hiroko Kasahara performed Ishtar's songs and Yukiyo Satō did Wendy Ryder's songs. Some of these songs were reused as background music in the 1995 series Macross 7.

The U.S. release of the soundtrack is as follows:

 JVC (1993) Macross II Original Soundtrack Volume 1 is released in North America on CD.  This compact disc contained the background music and vocal songs from, approximately, the first half of the series.
 AnimeTrax (2001) Volume 1 is re-released as the Macross II Original Soundtrack on CD.  This version retains the cover art from its Japanese counterpart and does not include the liner notes found in the JVC release.

Volume 2 was only released in Japan (along with Volume 1) by JVC's parent company, Victor Company of Japan, as The Super Dimension Fortress Macross II Original Soundtrack Vol. 2 in 1992.  This compact disc contained the background music and vocal songs from, approximately, the second half of the series.

Merchandising

Manga
Viz Comics published a ten-issue monthly comic book limited series called Super Dimensional Fortress Macross II that was circulated, monthly, from September 1992 through June 1993. This limited series was originally published as a manga in Shōnen Sunday Zōkan by Shogakukan in Japan and was released as a volume in March 1993. While a traditional manga will typically deviate from its anime counterpart, the Macross II manga was a direct adaption of the Macross II anime. The manga series was scripted by Sukehiro Tomita and illustrated by Tsuguo Okazaki. The English version was translated by James D. Hudnall and Matt Thorn.

In 1994, Viz Comics reissued the ten individual issues in a single trade paperback volume. Unlike the previous Viz series, which was released in the same size as Silver Age comic books, this compilation was published in the same size as conventional manga and was spiral-bound. In November 1994, Viz Comics published Macross II: The Micron Conspiracy as a five-issue comic book limited series. Marketed as a "100% made-in-America sequel", the story is set one year after the events of Macross II and follows Hibiki Kanzaki and Sylvie Gena as they attempt to uncover the explanation behind a series of mysterious attacks against the Zentradi on Earth.  This series was written by James D. Hudnall with illustrations provided by Schulhoff Tam.

Posters
Four official Macross II posters were released by U.S. Renditions, L.A. Hero and Viz Comics. The first two posters featured the cover art from "Marduk Disorder" and "Sing Along." These two posters each measured 25 x . The third poster released was the 27 x 41 ⅛ inches official theatrical poster for the Macross II 35 mm film release, featuring the cover art from "Station Break." The fourth poster, released by Viz Comics, featured Ishtar and measured 28 ⅝ x 40 ½ inches.

Role-playing game

In 1993, Palladium Books released a role-playing game called Macross II: The Role-Playing Game. This was followed that same year by Macross II: Sourcebook One—The U.N. Spacy, which was an extension of the first game. In 1994, Palladium joined forces with Canadian role-playing game company Dream Pod 9 to produce a three-part Deck Plans supplement series, which featured technical schematics of U.N. Spacy and Marduk warships and new rules for ship-to-ship combat.

Model kits
Bandai released a 1/100 scale model kit of the VF-2SS Valkyrie II. The model was capable of transforming into Fighter, Gerwalk and Battroid modes, but required the swapping of hip joints for each mode. The kit also included additional sprues for assembling the Super Armed Pack.
Several companies have made garage kits of the VF-2JA Icarus, as well as additional parts to convert the Bandai Valkyrie II into an atmospheric mode fighter without the Super Armed Pack.
Evolution Toys announced the release of a 1/60 VF-2ss Silvie Gina version for Fall 2015.

Video games
Banpresto released an arcade game adaptation of Macross II in 1993. The game was a side-scrolling shooter, where the player controlled a VF-2SS Valkyrie II and battled Marduk units on the screen. Transformation was attained only by acquiring lettered icons (B for Battroid, G for Gerwalk, F for Fighter). Players were armed with lasers and a limited number of smart bombs. They can only advance to the next stage if they reach a certain number of points.

Characters, mecha and story elements from this OVA are featured in the Sony PlayStation Portable videogame Macross Ultimate Frontier, the sequel to Macross Ace Frontier (2008). Ultimate Frontier was released in Japan in October 2009.

Reception
In 1992, Macross II was described as "the most eagerly anticipated anime sequel ever." Volumes 1 and 2 of Macross II went on to become the #1 selling anime videos in the United States in September 1992 and January 1993 respectively."Video Clips", Animerica, 1992, Vol.1, No.1, p. 18  Despite its bestseller status, Macross II failed to develop an affinity with many fans of the original Macross series.  Criticisms from Mecha Anime HQ concerned Macross II's decision to feature a journalist as the series protagonist instead of a military pilot, and that the storyline adhered too closely to its predecessor."Episode 6: Sing Along", Mecha Anime HQ  Anime News Network described the plot as "unoriginal" and noted that it seemed as if too much material was squeezed into Macross II''.

References

External links
Official Macross website 

Macross II at Macross Compendium
Macross II at Mecha and Anime Headquarters
Macross II at Macross Mecha Manual
Macross II: The Role Playing Game at RPG Geek Database
Macross II: The Role Playing Game at RPGnet Game Index

1992 anime OVAs
1992 manga
1993 anime films
Alien invasions in television
Anime International Company
Films set in the 2090s
Lovers, Again
OVAs composed by Shirō Sagisu
Shogakukan manga
Shōnen manga
Viz Media manga